Howard Irving Young (1893–1952) was an American screenwriter and playwright. During the 1930s and 1940s he worked on a number of British films.

Selected filmography
 A Million A Minute (1916)
 Miss Nobody (1917)
 Vengeance Is Mine (1917)
 No Trespassing (1922)
 Does It Pay? (1923)
 The Perfect Sap (1927)
 Her Wild Oat (1927)
 Midnight Mystery (1930)
 Television (1931)
 Music in the Air (1934)
 Spring Tonic (1935)
 Under Pressure (1935)
 Secret of Stamboul (1936)
 The Crimson Circle (1936)
 Said O'Reilly to McNab (1937)
 The Great Gambini (1937)
 Hey! Hey! USA (1938)
 Hi Gang! (1941)
 I Thank You (1941)
 It's That Man Again (1943)
 He Snoops to Conquer (1944)
 One Exciting Night (1944)
 Time Flies (1944)
 I Didn't Do It (1945)
 George in Civvy Street (1946)
 Let's Live a Little (1948)
 The Flying Saucer (1950)

References

Bibliography
 Marshall, Wendy L. William Beaudine: From Silents to Television. Scarecrow Press, 2005.

External links

1893 births
1952 deaths
Writers from Jersey City, New Jersey
Screenwriters from New Jersey
20th-century American screenwriters